The Minor Party Alliance (MPA) is a collaborative undertaking of small Australian political parties, created by Glenn Druery's "Independent Liaison" business, which assists in organising preference meetings and negotiating preference flows between minor parties (often referred to as micro-parties) in Australia. The aim of the Alliance is the election of Alliance candidates to Australian upper houses based upon the accumulation of their primary votes and the registered "above-the-line" (or "group voting ticket") party preferences to reach an electoral quota. For the Australian Senate, the quota for a half-Senate election in each State is normally 14.3%. The MPA effectively aims to "game" the electoral system, an act it believes to be justified, based upon their perception that the Australian electoral system is unfair and heavily biased against minor parties.

To stop preference deals like those made for the 2013 federal election, when a number of minor party candidates with very small primary votes were elected to the Senate, changes in the group voting rules were made in time for the 2016 federal election. Under the new rules, instead of placing a "1" above the line on Senate ballot papers or numbering every box below the line, voters can number 1 to 6 above the line in order of their preferences. Due to this, minor parties were no longer able to swap preferences in the same manner.

As at November 2022, only Victoria still has group ticket voting that enable similar preference deals being organised for those state upper house, with a similar preference deal between minor parties standing for the Victorian Legislative Council made at the 2018 Victorian state election. The proliferation of minor parties is attributable to the law that by contesting an election as a party, rather than as an individual, a candidate can accept votes above as well as below the line. This enables them to be a part of preference deals, which would not be possible as an independent.

1999 NSW preference deals
Druery initiated the MPA at the 1999 New South Wales state election and his then untested theories elected three people to the Legislative Council: Peter Wong from Unity, Peter Breen from Reform the Legal System and Malcolm Jones from the Outdoor Recreation Party. Malcolm Jones was elected to the Legislative Council with a primary vote of 0.19%, or 0.042 of a quota.

In 2017, Druery during a ABC report, has said he has a personal vendetta against Pauline Hanson One Nation, saying he has been directing micro party preferences away from One Nation since 1999.

2013 Senate preference deals
Druery is known as the preference whisperer of Australian politics, and his Minor Party Alliance was behind the 2013 federal election preference deal successes. These resulted in the election to the Senate of Wayne Dropulich of the Sports Party in Western Australia on a primary vote of 0.2%, Ricky Muir of the Motoring Enthusiasts Party in Victoria on a primary vote of 0.5% and Bob Day of the Family First Party on a primary vote of 3.8% in South Australia. However, the Western Australian result was later declared void (for semi-unrelated reasons), necessitating a further election at which the Sports Party candidate was unsuccessful. The fifth Senators in the other States were Dio Wang in Western Australia, Glenn Lazarus in Queensland and Jacqui Lambie in Tasmania, all from the Palmer United Party, and David Leyonhjelm of the Liberal Democratic Party elected with a primary vote of 9.5% in New South Wales. These last four were not part of the MPA.

Muir's primary vote was 0.5% and achieved the 14.3% quota from 23 "above the line" party preferences: Bank Reform Party, Australian Fishing and Lifestyle Party, HEMP Party, Shooters and Fishers, Australian Stable Population Party, Senator Online, Building Australia Party, Family First Party, Bullet Train For Australia, Rise Up Australia Party, No Carbon Tax Climate Sceptics, Citizens Electoral Council, Palmer United Party, Democratic Labour Party, Katter's Australian Party, Socialist Equality Party, Australian Sex Party, Australian Voice Party, Wikileaks Party, Drug Law Reform, Stop CSG, Animal Justice Party, and the Australian Independents Party.

Day's primary vote was 3.8% (down 0.3% since the previous election), and achieved the 14.3% quota from 19 "above the line" party preferences: Australian Independents Party, Australian Stable Population Party, Liberal Democratic Party, Smokers' Rights Party, No Carbon Tax Climate Sceptics, Building Australia Party, Rise Up Australia Party, Katter's Australian Party, One Nation, Australian Fishing and Lifestyle Party, Australian Christians, Shooters and Fishers, Australian Motoring Enthusiast Party, Democratic Labour Party, Animal Justice Party, Australian Greens, Palmer United Party, HEMP Party, Australian Labor Party.

Druery also helped the Shooters and Fishers Party, Family First Party and the Fishing and Lifestyle Party. After the 2013 federal election Druery was hired by the newly elected Motor Enthusiast Party Senator Ricky Muir as Chief of Staff, but later parted company with Muir.

2017 Western Australian preference deals
Western Australia continues to use group voting tickets for the Western Australian Legislative Council. At the 2017 Western Australian state election, five parties participated in preference deals orchestrated by Druery. The parties were Family First, Fluoride Free WA, Liberal Democrats, Flux the System and the Daylight Saving Party. The deals were arranged so that the ticket votes for these five parties would roll up to a different party in each region. At the election only the Liberal Democrat candidate, Aaron Stonehouse, with 1.77% of primary votes was elected with MPA preferences.

2018 Victorian preference deals
Victoria continues to use group voting tickets for the Victorian Legislative Council. Preference deals were also organised by Druery for the Victorian Legislative Council at the 2018 Victorian state election. All but one of the 18 parties standing appear to have been involved in some way in the deals. Ultimately, 10 candidates from seven micro-parties were elected. In the Eastern Metropolitan Region, Rod Barton of the Transport Matters Party was elected on a primary vote of 0.62%. In the Southern Metropolitan Region, Clifford Hayes of the Sustainable Australia was elected on a primary vote of 1.32%. One candidate was elected from the Shooters and Fishers Party, the Reason Party and the Animal Justice Party, two from the Liberal Democratic Party and three from the Justice Party.

2022 Victorian preference deals
On November 16, 2022, Angry Victorians Party party leader Heston Russell leaked a video to the Herald Sun of him to talking to Glenn Druery about a potential preference deal, declaring that the AVP felt the co-ordination of the group voting ticket system used by Druery was immoral and needed to be exposed.

During 2022 Victorian state election Druery was reported to be working with the Democratic Labour party (DLP),Derryn Hinch's Justice Party, Health Australia, the Liberal Democrats, the New Democrats, the Shooters, Fishers and Farmers, Sustainable Australia party and Transport Matters Party, and the Angry Victorians party. He was working with the Animal Justice party but they tricked him, by leaving the alliance.

Members 
The parties that are or have been involved in the Minor Party Alliance:

The Minor Party Alliance has involved more than 30 minor parties, including:

Australia First Party
Australian Christians
Australian Stable Population Party
Christian Democratic Party
Natural Medicine Party
Non-Custodial Parents Party
One Nation
Rise Up Australia Party
Senator Online
Shooters and Fishers Party
Sustainable Australia
Transport Matters Party
Voluntary Euthanasia Party

Former parties
The Wikileaks Party
Australian Motoring Enthusiast Party
Australian Democrats
Australian Fishing and Lifestyle Party
Australian Independents
Australian Protectionist Party
Australian Voice Party
Building Australia Party
Bullet Train For Australia
Drug Law Reform Australia
Family First Party
Mutual Party
No Carbon Tax Climate Sceptics
Stop CSG Party
Uniting Australia Party

References

External links
Independent Liaison website - archive.org
Glenn Druery, Independent Liaison website - archive.org

Political organisations based in Australia